Mironeasa is a commune in Iași County, Western Moldavia, Romania. It is composed of three villages: Mironeasa, Schitu Hadâmbului and Urșița.

References

Communes in Iași County
Localities in Western Moldavia